Scarr's Pizza is a pizzeria at 22 Orchard Street in the Lower East Side neighborhood of Manhattan, New York City.

The restaurant was founded in 2016 by Scarr Pimentel, a New York native who learned to make pizza at Lombardi's. 

Staff mills some of the wheat for the restaurant's fermented crust in the pizzeria's basement daily, mixing it with flour from upstate New York in a compromise to keep up with demand. It is the only pizza-by-the-slice restaurant milling its own flour in New York, according to Serious Eats. Gothamist wrote that its cheese is a combination of three types of mozzarella and sauce is made fresh.

The restaurant sourced much of its decor from a bowling alley which, in combination with its wood paneled walls, and letter boards, is intended to recreate the diner-like aesthetic of neighborhood pizzerias from the 1970s or 1980s. Several reviewers praised the dough, cheese, sauce, and ingredient selection, and it was named one of the best pizza slices in New York by the New York Times, Gothamist, and Serious Eats. In a mixed review by The Infatuation, Bryan Kim wrote that Scarr's works better if you think of it as a bar that serves pizza rather than expect a comfortable sit-down restaurant.

A second location in a food hall in Midtown Manhattan was planned, but was postponed due to the COVID-19 pandemic.

References

External links

Pizzerias in New York City
2016 establishments in New York City
Lower East Side